Count Dmitry Alekseyevich Milyutin (tr. ; 28 June 1816, Moscow – 25 January 1912, Simeiz near Yalta) was Minister of War (1861–81) and the last Field Marshal of Imperial Russia (1898). He played a major role in the Circassian genocide. He was responsible for sweeping military reforms that changed the face of the Russian army in the 1860s and 1870s.

Early career 

Milyutin graduated from the Moscow University School in 1833 and Nicholas Military Academy in 1836. Unlike his brother Nikolai Milyutin, who chose to pursue a career in civil administration, Dmitry volunteered to take part in the Caucasian War (1839–45). After sustaining a grave wound, he returned to the military academy to deliver lectures as a professor. 

In the following years, Milyutin earned a considerable reputation as a brilliant scholar. He emphasized the scientific value of military statistics and authored the first comprehensive study of the subject, which earned him the Demidov Prize for 1847. Milyutin regarded Suvorov as a model for military commanders and the Italian campaign of 1799 as the pinnacle of his career, elaborating these views in a detailed account of the campaign, published in five volumes in 1852 and 1853.

Capitalizing on his knowledge, Milyutin analyzed the causes of Russia's defeat in the Crimean War and framed some radical proposals for military reforms. His ideas were approved by Alexander II, who appointed Milyutin to the post of Minister of War in 1861. Several years earlier, Milyutin had taken part in the capture of Shamil, thus helping bring the prolonged Caucasian War to an end.

Minister of War 
Milyutin was Minister of War from 16 May 1861 to 21 May 1881. The military reforms carried on during Milyutin's long tenure resulted in the levy system being introduced to Russia and military districts being created across the country. Military service was declared compulsory to all males aged 21 for 6 years instead of the previous 25 years. This applied to all males including nobles. The system of military education was also reformed, and elementary education was made available to all the draftees. Milyutin's reforms are regarded as a milestone in the history of Russia: they dispensed with the military recruitment and professional army introduced by Peter the Great and created the Russian army such as it continued into the 21st century until Anatoliy Serdyukov announced military reforms to end in 2020. (See: 2008 Russian military reform)
Up to Dmitry Milyutin's reforms in 1874 Russian Army had no constant barracks and was billeted in dugouts and shacks.
The success of his reforms was demonstrated during the Russo-Turkish War (1877-1878). Milyutin's subtle leadership made itself felt during the peak of the conflict when the Russians failed three times in a row to take Pleven and many experts advised them to retreat. Milyutin promptly ordered the siege to be continued in a more orderly manner which brought the war to a victorious end. At the close of the war, Milyutin set up a commission in order to investigate faulty supply of provisions and other problems that had surfaced during the siege. In recognition of his services, he was made a count and received all the Russian orders, including the Order of Saint Andrew.

Having gained the tsar's ear, Milyutin was the chief decision-maker,  for ordering the deportations that he knew would  cause the death from starvation and disease of large numbers of Circassians from 1861 to 1865.

Later life 

After the Congress of Berlin, Milyutin succeeded the ailing Chancellor Gorchakov as the leader of the imperial foreign policy. Alexander II's assassination in 1881 rendered his position precarious, however, and after Konstantin Pobedonostsev, intent on reversing the liberal innovations of the previous reign, emerged as the most powerful policy-maker, Milyutin resigned his office. In 1898, when the 80th anniversary of Alexander II was celebrated, he was promoted to Field Marshal, the first man to receive this honour for many years and the last in the history of the Russian Empire. He died in Simeiz in 1912.

Honours and awards

Domestic
 Order of St. Anna, 1st class
 Order of St. Anna, 2nd class
 Order of the White Eagle
 Order of St. Stanislaus, 1st class
 Order of St. Stanislaus, 3rd class
 Order of St. Vladimir, 1st class
 Order of St. Alexander Nevsky
 Order of St. Andrew
 Demidov Prize
 Order of St. George, 2nd class

Foreign
 
 Order of the Star of Romania
  Kingdom of Prussia:
 Grand Cross of the Order of the Red Eagle, 9 September 1872
 Pour le Mérite (military), 22 March 1879
 Knight of the Order of the Black Eagle, 4 September 1879
 :
 Knight of the Imperial Order of the Iron Crown, 2nd Class, 1853
 Grand Cross of the Austrian Imperial Order of Leopold, 1872
 
 Grand Cross of the Legion of Honour, September 1876
 French Order of Academic Palms
 :
 Knight of the Royal Order of the Seraphim, 19 July 1875
  Kingdom of Denmark:
 Knight of the Order of the Elephant, 19 August 1876
 :
 Grand Cross of the Royal Hungarian Order of St. Stephen, 1874
  Grand Duchy of Mecklenburg-Strelitz
 House Order of the Wendish Crown
 
 Order of the Cross of Takovo
 
 Order of Prince Danilo I
 
 Order of the Lion and the Sun

References

Further reading 
 Forrest A. Miller,  Dmitrii Miliutin and the Reform Era in Russia (1968)
  Walter Richmond, The Circassian Genocide (Rutgers University Press, 2013) online
 His memoirs have been reprinted. The early years in a volume published by Oriental Research Partners (Newtonville, Mass) in 1978 with a new useful introduction by Prof. Bruce Lincoln. A three volume set of memoirs of his later years was published by Rossiiski arkhiv (Moscow 1999-2006) Pp. 525, 557, 730.

External links 

1816 births
1912 deaths
Writers from Moscow
People from Moskovsky Uyezd
Counts of the Russian Empire
Members of the State Council (Russian Empire)
Field marshals of Russia
Politicians of the Russian Empire
Military writers from the Russian Empire
Reformers
Corresponding members of the Saint Petersburg Academy of Sciences
Russian military personnel of the Caucasian War
Circassian genocide perpetrators
Demidov Prize laureates
Honorary members of the Saint Petersburg Academy of Sciences
Recipients of the Order of St. George of the Second Degree
Recipients of the Order of the Cross of Takovo
Recipients of the Pour le Mérite (military class)
Grand Crosses of the Order of Saint Stephen of Hungary
Grand Croix of the Légion d'honneur